Enydra may refer to:
Enydra (moth), a genus of moths in the family Noctuidae
Enydra (plant), a genus of plants in the family Asteraceae